The 2018 Super Rugby Final was played between the Crusaders of New Zealand and the Lions of South Africa. The match, held at Rugby League Park in Christchurch, was the 23rd final in the Super Rugby competition's history.

Both finalists won their respective conferences during the regular season and both had hosted quarterfinal and semifinal matches in the playoff series. The final was hosted by the Crusaders as the higher placed team from the regular season standings.

The Crusaders won the match by a margin of 19 points. The Lions started the final well, however the combination of travel, jet-lag and the sheer dominance of the Crusaders was instrumental in securing the result. The Crusaders extended their record number of Super Rugby title wins to nine and became the first team to win back-to-back titles since the Chiefs in 2013.

Road to the final 

After two seasons in which 18 teams participated, the 2018 season reverted to a 15-team competition, consisting of three geographical conferences.

Their four wildcard opponents in the quarterfinals were the next best teams as ranked at the end of the regular season.

All four home teams won their quarterfinal matches to set up an all-New Zealand clash between the Crusaders and Hurricanes for the first semifinal in Christchurch, while the Lions hosted the Waratahs for the second semifinal in Johannesburg.

Both home teams won their semifinal matches with comfortable margins. The Lions then travelled away to Christchurch to play the Crusaders in the 2018 Super Rugby final.

Quarter-finals

Semi-finals

Match

Details

References 

2018 Super Rugby season
Super Rugby finals
2018 in New Zealand rugby union
2018 in South African rugby union
Crusaders (rugby union) matches
Lions (United Rugby Championship) matches
Sports competitions in Christchurch